The military–entertainment complex is the cooperation between militaries and entertainment industries to their mutual benefit, especially in such fields as cinema, multimedia, virtual reality, and multisensory extended reality.

Though the term can be used to describe any military–entertainment complex in any nation, the most prominent complex is between the United States Department of Defense (DoD) and the film industry of the United States.

Movies 
In Hollywood, many movie and television productions are, by choice, contractually supervised by the DoD Entertainment Media Unit within the Office of the Secretary of Defense at the Pentagon, and by the public affairs offices of the military services maintained solely for the American entertainment industry in Hollywood, Los Angeles. Producers looking to borrow military equipment or filming on location at a military installation for their works need to apply to the DoD, and submit their movies' scripts for vetting. Ultimately, the DoD has a say in every U.S.-made movie that uses DoD resources, not available on the open market, in their productions.

During World War II, Hollywood "became the unofficial propaganda arm of the U.S. military". The United States Office of War Information (OWI) had a unit exclusively dedicated to Hollywood called the Bureau of Motion Pictures. From 1942 to 1945, the OWI's Bureau of Motion Pictures reviewed 1,652 film scripts and revised or discarded any that portrayed the United States in a negative light, including material that made Americans seem "oblivious to the war or anti-war." Elmer Davis, the head of the OWI, said that "The easiest way to inject a propaganda idea into most people's minds is to let it go through the medium of an entertainment picture when they do not realize they're being propagandized".

Four decades after the release of the 1954 adult animated film Animal Farm, Cold War historian Tony Shaw discovered, through looking at archives of the film, that the CIA had secretly purchased the rights to the film. The CIA also altered the ending of the film so that the pigs, who represent communists, were overthrown by the other animals on the farm.

The 1986 film Top Gun, produced by Don Simpson and Jerry Bruckheimer at Paramount Pictures, and with DoD assistance, aimed at rebranding the U.S. Navy's image in the post-Vietnam War era. During the showings of the film, military recruiters set up tables in cinemas during its premieres. However, claims enlistments spiked as high as 500% are a myth, and enlistments only rose by approximately 8% in 1986. By the end of the 1980s and early 1990s, Hollywood producers were stressing script writers to create military-related plots to gain production power from the U.S. military.

Some American movies co-scripted with the DoD include:

 Air Force One (1997)
 Apollo 13 (1995)
 Armageddon (1998)
 Batman & Robin (1997)
 Battleship (2012)
 Behind Enemy Lines (2001)
 Black Hawk Down (2001)
 Captain Phillips (2013)
 Deep Impact (1998)
 Godzilla (1998)
 The Green Berets (1968)
 I Am Legend (2007)
 Indiana Jones and the Last Crusade (1989)
 Iron Man (2008)
 Iron Man 2 (2010)
 The Jackal (1997)
 James Bond series:
 Goldfinger (1964)
 Thunderball (1965)
 Licence to Kill (1989)
 GoldenEye (1995)
 Tomorrow Never Dies (1997)
 Jurassic Park III (2001)
 The Karate Kid Part II (1986)
 The Next Karate Kid (1994)
 King Kong (2005)
 Midway (2019)
 Last Action Hero (1993)
 Red Dawn (1984)
 The Silence of the Lambs (1991)
 Star Trek IV: The Voyage Home (1986)
 Top Gun (1986)
 Top Gun: Maverick (2022)
 Transformers (2007)
 Transformers: Revenge of the Fallen (2009)
 Transformers: Dark of the Moon (2011)
 Transformers: The Last Knight (2017)
 True Lies (1994)
 Wonder Woman 1984 (2020)
Wings (1927)

The website Spy Culture compiled a list of 410 DoD-sponsored movies.

The CIA collaborated extensively in the production of the 2012 film Zero Dark Thirty.

The documentary Theaters of War (2022) says that more than 2,500 films and TV shows have been supervised by the military, mostly, as well as the security services.

 Music videos 

Katy Perry's 2012 music video "Part of Me", in which she signs up to join the Marines, was shot at USMC Camp Pendleton in Oceanside, California, with the support of the Marines.

On YouTube, a new music video genre appeared, the military music videos. Typically, these are video clips portraying singers in military equipment and surrounded by military vehicles and weapons. This video genre is used by a number of armed forces across the globe (list of examples below)

 Azerbaijan's State Border Service: QƏLƏBƏNİN YOLLARI National Army of Colombia: Espada de Honor People's Liberation Army: Battle Declaration Russian Airborne Forces:
 Iraqi Army: شمس المصلاوي - انا عراقية The United States Air Force has an official rock band, Max Impact, and released a punk version of its official anthem. In early 2019, the U.S. Army released a promotional military hip hop video, "Giving All I Got", with the explicit intent to get the attention of the younger crowd.

 Video games 

In his book From Sun Tzu to Xbox, Ed Halter wrote "The technologies that shape our culture have always been pushed forward by war". Video games "were not created directly for military purposes, [they] arose out of an intellectual environment whose existence was entirely predicated on defense research". The first known virtual military training equipment, a flight simulator made of wood, was created in the 1920s by Edward Link. Since the Second World War, the U.S. Army and its sub-agencies played a major role in the development of digital computers. The DARPA, an agency of the DoD, contributed to the development of Advanced computing systems, computer graphics, the Internet, multiplayer networked systems, and the 3-D navigation of virtual environments.

Arguably the first video game (faux-military simulation), the PDP-1-powered Spacewar!, was developed in 1962. The U.S. Army's first video game created for training purposes, the board game Mech War, was implemented in the staff officer training curriculum in the 1970s at the Army War College. During the 1980s, Academic and military researchers led the development of distributed interactive simulations (DIS) that enable the creation of real-time, virtual theaters of war. The release by Atari of the game Battlezone was a revolution for the graphics perspective, introducing first-person shooter games for the first time. Donn A. Starry, head of the United States Army Training and Doctrine Command (TRADOC), said in a conference in 1981: "[Today's soldiers have] learned to learn in a different world, ... a world of television, electronic toys and games, computers, and a host of other electronic devices. They belong to a TV and technology generation... [so] how is it that our soldiers are still sitting in classrooms, still listening to lectures, still depending on books and other paper reading materials, when possibly new and better methods have been available for many years?" The Air Force captain Jack A. Thorpe developed SIMNET with DARPA, a real-time distributed networking to modernize virtual simulation capacities and enable soldiers to experience war situation in times of peace. The magazine Wired argued this was the real embryo of the Internet.

After the first-person-shooter hit Doom came out in 1993, the Marine Corps Modeling and Simulation Office (MCMSO) released the online Personal Computer Based Wargames Catalog where Army personnel published detailed reviews of the video games they investigated. Doom became the MCMSO's absolute preference, and in 1995, the game Marine Doom was released, and the alien-themed graphics of the game's first version was replaced by military-themed graphics.

Dave Anthony, a writer for Call of Duty, left his job and became an "unknown conflict" adviser for the Department of Defense.

The video game Homefront was created by John Milius, who also wrote/directed the 1984 war film Red Dawn that gave its name to the Operation Red Dawn which led to the capture of Saddam Hussein.

Sometimes the military will create their own games, such as America's Army, a free first-person shooter that was intended to educate and recruit prospective soldiers.

 Professional sports 

The U.S. military has provided $53 million in funding to professional sports organizations in exchange for pro-military messaging, such as a "salute" to active duty soldiers and war veterans. This practice is common in the NFL and NASCAR with the latter's "NASCAR Salutes" program running through the entirety of May.

 Film Liaison Unit heads 

 Philip Strub 
Philip Meredith Strub was the head of the DoD's Film Liaison Unit from 1989 to 2018. Strub oversaw the creation of "Dara", a DoD database of all entertainment productions that had approached the department for assistance. Strub received his bachelor's degree in political science from Saint Louis University in Missouri in 1968; was commissioned as a U.S. Navy officer; and received a master's in cinema production in 1974 from the University of Southern California.

 David Evans 
David Evans became head of the DoD's Film Liaison Unit after Strub's retirement in 2018. Evans spent 13 years as a public affairs specialist at the DoD and then spent four years working as Strub's deputy. Less is known about Evans than even Strub. Shortly after his appointment, his LinkedIn profile was deleted.

 See also 
 List of industrial complexes
 "New Kids on the Blecch", an episode of The Simpsons'' parodying the military use of popular media to engage possible recruits.
Military–industrial complex

References

Bibliography

External links 

 Tim Lenoir, Henry Lowood, Theaters of war: the military-entertainment complex, Stanford University

Military culture
Military–industrial complex
Military fiction
Entertainment
Industrial complexes